Avalon, in comics, may to:

Avalon (webcomic), a webcomic written by Josh Phillips
Marvel Comics locations:
Avalon (Marvel Comics), an otherdimensional realm which has also been called "Otherworld"
Avalon, in the Marvel Comics alternate reality Age of Apocalypse, the name given to the Savage Land
Avalon, the name Magneto gave to Cable's space station Greymalkin, when he took it over. After the station returned to Earth, Cable rebuilt it and renamed it Providence (comics)
Avalon, the surname of four Cardcaptors characters (the American-version of Cardcaptor Sakura):
Sakura Avalon
Tori Avalon
Aiden Avalon
Natasha Avalon
Captain Avalon, an alias used briefly by The Captain
Avalon Studios (comics company) was a subsidiary of Image Comics founded by Whilce Portacio and Brian Haberlin in the 1990s

See also
 Avalon (disambiguation)
 Otherworld (comics)